Walter (Wal) James Chisholm (19 May 1915 – 28 December 2005) was born in Auckland, New Zealand in 1915, and moved to Melbourne, Australia in 1936 to pursue his cycling career. World War II put an end to his sporting exploits and he joined the army in 1941. After serving as a commando overseas, he returned and married Yvonne Patricia (Pat) McLaughlin, whom he'd met at a dance in Pat's hometown of Echuca in Northern Victoria. They settled in the bayside suburb of Cheltenham. He always had a keen interest in athletics, in particular the pole vault, so he set about learning as much as he could about the event, leading to him coaching the local kids in the Mentone area, adjacent to Cheltenham. Over the next 50 years, he coached many athletes, vaulters, runners and most other events as needed, but the pole vault was his passion, and by the end of his coaching career he had been the coach of twenty Australian championships and over twenty state championships.

He was coach to:
Ray Boyd, a dual Olympian, and Commonwealth Games gold medalist, 
Ross Filshie who was Australia's first 14' and 15' vaulter, 
Mike Sullivan, Australia's first 16' vaulter, 
Ed Johnson, Australia's first 17' vaulter and 
Don Baird, who travelled to West Germany and became Australia's first 18' vaulter.

Ironically, his son Robert Chisholm was his last Australian champion in 1984.

He died at age 90.

1915 births
2005 deaths
Sportspeople from Auckland
Australian male pole vaulters
Australian athletics coaches
New Zealand emigrants to Australia
Australian Army personnel of World War II
Australian Army soldiers